Silvana Mirvić (born 4 March 1971) is a former Bosnian and Yugoslav professional basketball player who participated at the EuroBasket 1991 for Yugoslavia, and then for Bosnia and Herzegovina at the 1993 Mediterranean Games, and two EuroBasket competitions in 1997 and 1999. She played for Čelik Zenica in the Adriatic League season 2010 - 2011.

References

External links
Profile at Eurobasket LLC
Profile at FIBA

1971 births
Living people
Bosnia and Herzegovina women's basketball players
Yugoslav women's basketball players
Forwards (basketball)
Mediterranean Games gold medalists for Bosnia and Herzegovina
Mediterranean Games medalists in basketball